Podothecus is a genus of poachers native to the northern Pacific Ocean.

Species

There are currently five recognized species in this genus:
 Podothecus accipenserinus (Tilesius, 1813) (Sturgeon poacher)
 Podothecus hamlini D. S. Jordan & C. H. Gilbert, 1898
 Podothecus sachi (D. S. Jordan & Snyder, 1901)
 Podothecus sturioides (Guichenot, 1869)
 Podothecus veternus D. S. Jordan & Starks, 1895

References

Agoninae
 
Taxa named by Theodore Gill
Marine fish genera